Events from the year 1548 in Ireland.

Incumbent
Monarch: Edward VI

Events
February 10 – The Exchequer orders the minting of groats at Dublin Castle.
March 8 – Order of communion issued.
April 22 – Sir Edward Bellingham is appointed Lord Deputy of Ireland.
August – Bellingham, accompanied by Nicholas Bagenal, defeats Irish forces at Kildare under Cahir O'Connor, who is captured and executed.
c. November–December – Brian O'Connor of Offaly (brother of Cahir) and Patrick O'More submit to the Lord Deputy and are sent to England.  
Surviving portions of the Annals of Nenagh end.

Births

Deaths

References

 
1540s in Ireland
Ireland
Years of the 16th century in Ireland